Mukhya Mantri Yuva Swarozgar Yojana or MMYSY is a government of Madhya Pradesh scheme under which the State Government will give bank guarantee and loan subsidy to promote entrepreneurship.

References

Government schemes in Madhya Pradesh
Entrepreneurship in India